Suneet Singh Tuli is the co-founder of DataWind. He was born in 1968 to Lakhvir Singh, the head of an entrepreneur, Sikh family. He graduated from Toronto University in 1990 in Applied Sciences in Engineering. While being student he started working In his brother Raja Tuli's entrepreneurial firm, Widekom. He started work with the objective of developing sales of large size fax machines.  He got large size fax machines recorded in Guinness book of world records. By getting boosting sale of 600 machInes in six months at Can $20000 ; Tuli brothers turned into millionaires.

In his second innovative venture, he started creating battery operated handheld printers and hand held scanners under the name of the DocuPort Company.
These two companies were among first formed by people of Indian origin in making public offerings on NASDAQ.
Most recently, Datawind's Aakash/Ubislate tablets have attracted worldwide attention due to its affordable price to weaker sections of world's population for empowering them with computational and internet access.

Awards & Recognitions

Suneet Singh Tuli has been recognised by Forbes Magazine in its 2012 Impact 15 list as a Class Room Revolutionary
Ban Ki-moon Secretary General of United Nations, while launching his product Aakash 2 tablet spoke about it being great enabler to transform people's lives, in educating and empowering poor with internet and computing access.
In 2012, he and his brother received a technology achievement award from the Indo-Canadian Chamber of Commerce.
Chief Khalsa Dewan honoured him on 65th and 66th World Sikh educational conference in 2014 and 2016 consecutively and in 2012 he has been recognised as Enterpreuner of the Year at World Sikh awards.

References

Canadian people of Indian descent
Canadian people of Punjabi descent
1968 births
Living people